Sialkot Cantonment railway station is located in Sialkot, Pakistan.

See also
 List of railway stations in Pakistan
 Pakistan Railways

References

External links

Railway stations in Sialkot District
Transport in Sialkot